Champions Cup may refer to one of many sports competitions:

Association football
A3 Champions Cup, an annual association football, competition involving the league champions of China, Japan and South Korea
Brazilian Champions Cup or Copa dos Campeões, an annual association football competition played in Brazil
CONCACAF Champions' Cup, an annual international soccer competition held in the CONCACAF region (North America, Central America and the Caribbean)
Gulf Club Champions Cup, an annual association football, competition for clubs in the Persian Gulf
JFF Champions Cup, the top knockout association football, tournament of Jamaica
Outremer Champions Cup, an annual association football, competition played in France
UEFA Champions League, formerly known as the "European Champions Cup", an association football club tournament in Europe
Champions Youth Cup, the first edition of an annual football tournament
Champions Cup (India), the first edition of an annual international football tournament in India
Champions Cup (All-Ireland), an all-Ireland competition between the league champions of both associations on the island of Ireland
International Champions Cup, an annual club association football exhibition competition

Bandy
 FIB Champions Cup, an annual international bandy tournament

Basketball
 FIBA European Champions' Cup, now known as EuroLeague

Cricket
Champions Cup 2000–01, a limited overs cricket tournament played from 29 March 2001 to 4 April 2001 in Perth, Australia

Curling
Champions Cup (curling), a men's and women's Grand Slam of Curling event

Field hockey
EuroHockey Club Champions Cup, a field hockey competition for clubs in Europe

Floorball
Champions Cup (floorball), a floorball competition for the clubs from top four ranked floorball countries

Horse racing
Champions Cup (horse race), a prestigious Thoroughbred horse race in Japan, formerly known as the Japan Cup Dirt

Ice hockey
IIHF European Champions Cup, a former annual ice hockey tournament between the champions of national International Ice Hockey Federation competitions
Champions Cup (ice hockey), the former name of the trophy for the post-season champion of the All American Hockey League

Inline hockey
Champions Cup (inline hockey), the trophy awarded to the playoff winners of the American Inline Hockey League's Elite Division

Lacrosse
Champion's Cup, the trophy awarded to the playoff winners in the National Lacrosse League from 1998 to 2017

Rugby union
European Rugby Champions Cup, top-level European club competition
NSCRO Champions Cup, a college rugby championship in the United States

Snooker
Champions Cup (snooker), a professional snooker tournament

Volleyball
Volleyball Grand Champions Cup, one of many indoor volleyball world titles

Sailing
EUROSAF Champions Sailing Cup, series of sailing regattas in Europe

See also
Champions League (disambiguation) 
Championship Cup